Melanie Theresia Berentz (born 7 September 1999) is an Indonesian actress, model and beauty pageant titleholder, who was crowned Puteri Indonesia West Java 2022, She represented West Java at the Puteri Indonesia 2022 pageant, finishing in the top six.

Early life and career
Berentz was born on September 7, 1999, in Mount Elizabeth Hospital, Novena – Singapore, to a Sundanese mother Melinda Antoinette and a German father, Marcopoli Heinrich Berentz from München, Germany. The family later moved from Singapore, Dubai and München before settling in Bandung when she was 12 years old.

She worked as a commercial model before starring in the film SIN together with Bryan Elmi Domani.

Pageantry

Puteri West Java 2022 and Puteri Indonesia 2022 
At the age of 22, Berentz started her foray into the world of pageantry by joined the contest at the provincial level of the Puteri Indonesia West Java, held on 17 January 2022. She ended up was chosen as the winner of Puteri Indonesia West Java 2022,  After qualifying the provincial title of Puteri Indonesia West Java 2022, Berentz represented the province of West Java in the upcoming national beauty contest, Puteri Indonesia 2022, which was held on May 27, 2022, in Jakarta Convention Centre.

Filmography

Movies

Television films

See also

 Puteri Indonesia
 Puteri Indonesia 2022
 Miss Universe 2022

References

External links

 
 
 Official Puteri Indonesia Official Website
 Official Miss Universe Official Website

Living people
1999 births
Puteri Indonesia winners
Indonesian beauty pageant winners
Indonesian film actresses
Indonesian television actresses
Indonesian female models
21st-century Indonesian actresses
People from Munich
People from Bavaria
People from Bandung
People from West Java
Sundanese people
Indonesian people of German descent
German people of Indonesian descent